Artrix is an arts venue in Bromsgrove, England, located on School Drive just outside the town centre. The building was constructed between 2004 and 2005 on a green field site sold off by the Heart of Worcestershire College Bromsgrove campus (formerly NEWcollege) in 1999 and the Bromsgrove 'Blue Light' centre. 

It hosts theatre and dance performances, cinema screenings, live music including touring bands, solo artists, touring theatre and both ballet and contemporary dance. Performance of  classical music and comedy from well-known performers to circuit comedians.
It also works with local groups and organisations as part of Bromsgrove Arts Alive which provides space for theatre performances, a Pantomime a classical music club, spoken word talks (featuring playwright, novelists, poets and historians) and productions by local dance schools.

Artrix also has a very active learning and engagement department that coordinates many projects including a youth theatre group and projects in the community for all ages and social standing.

The main auditorium has a seating capacity of approximately 301. The seating in both venues can be dismantled to create open spaces for events. Four multipurpose rooms are available for meetings and during productions as dressing rooms.
The building also contains a rehearsal room/dance studio on the second floor which since 2013 has been regularly used as a studio theatre in addition to its main house for small scale theatre, music and spoken word with a seated capacity of 90.
There is an art gallery on the three floors of the venue. 

Both the main house and the studio are soundproofed and are not linked structurally within the building, in order to eliminate sound conduction between the two. There is also a licensed cafe-bar.

At the start of the COVID-19 lockdown the old operating company found itself recovering from the end of a series of large long-term contract hires and a sudden halt to activities and ran-out of operating finance. Due to this, the company wasn't able to operate legally due to its charitable status and was sadly to go into voluntary liquidation.
The assets were then purchased by Bromsgrove District Council with the intention to looking at options to re-open the venue once the situation improved.
The venue is currently the COVID mass vaccination centre for Bromsgrove. Several groups are looking at options to reopen the venue.

References

External links

Theatres in England
Dance venues in England
Music venues in Worcestershire
Bromsgrove